= Goodnight Soldier =

Song
- Published: 1943
- Songwriter(s): Harry Johnson

Goodnight Soldier is a song written by Harry Johnson in 1943 and published by Joe Cascales Publications.
